The following is a list of events affecting Mexican television in 2016. Events listed include television show debuts, finales, and cancellations; channel launches, closures, and re-brandings; stations changing or adding their network affiliations; and information about controversies and carriage disputes.

Events
5 August-21 August - The 2016 Summer Olympics were broadcast on Canal Once and Canal 22.
31 December - Mexico's nationwide digital television transition was completed after the mandatory shutdown of analog television service for mid- and low-powered stations, which were given a one-year extension of the nationwide deadline of 31 December 2015.

Television shows

Debuts 
40 y 20 (2016–present)

Programs on-air

1970s
Plaza Sesamo (1972–present)

1990s
Acapulco Bay (1995–present) 
Corazon salvaje (1993–present) 
Esmeralda (1997–present) 
La usurpadora (1998–present)

2000s
Alma de hierro (2008–present) 
Big Brother México (2002-2005, 2015–present)
Hotel Erotica Cabo (2006–present) 
Lo Que Callamos Las Mujeres (2001–present)

2010s 
40 y 20 (2016–present) 
Como dice el dicho (2011–present) 
La Voz… México (2011–present) 
México Tiene Talento (2014–present) 
Valiant Love (2012–present)

Television stations

Station launches

Network affiliation changes

Deaths

See also
List of Mexican films of 2016
2016 in Mexico

References